Diestedde is a village in the municipality Wadersloh and is part of the district Warendorf. The peasantries Altendiestedde, Düllo, Entrup and Geist belong to the greater area of Diestedde.

Geography 
Diestedde is located approximately 10 km east of Beckum and 20 km north-east of Lippstadt. The mean elevation above sea level is between 100 and 105 m. The highest point of the district Wadersloh with 139 m above sea level is also located in Diestedde.

References

Former municipalities in North Rhine-Westphalia